Geumdangcheon is a river of South Korea. It is a river of the Han River system. The stream flows north–south.

References

Rivers of South Korea